Josiah Middaugh (born 25 July 1978) is an American professional triathlete, who most notably won the XTERRA Triathlon World Championships in 2015. He has also won 11 national XTERRA championships.

References

External links

Firstendurance.com

1978 births
Living people
American male triathletes
Sportspeople from Michigan